"Won't Let You Down" is a 2014 song by Hilltop Hoods featuring Maverick Sabre.

Won't Let You Down may also refer to:

 Won't Let You Down (album), by Bridget Kearney, 2017
 "Won't Let You Down", a song by Chamillionaire featuring Kevin Cossom, from the 2007 album Ultimate Victory
 "Won't Let You Down", a B-side to "Lyla", a 2005 song by Oasis

See also
 Let You Down (disambiguation)
 I Won't Let You Down (disambiguation)